The Big Game is a 1973 action film directed by Robert Day and starring Stephen Boyd, France Nuyen and Ray Milland. It was shot on location in Cape Town, Rome and Hong Kong. It is also known by the alternative title of Control Factor.

Synopsis
Seeking a way to promote world peace a wealthy American develops a machine that can control people's minds, and hires two mercenaries to protect it on a ship travelling to Austria where they confront assault by hostile agents.

Cast
 Stephen Boyd as Leyton van Dyk 
 France Nuyen as Atanga 
 Ray Milland as Prof. Pete Handley 
 Cameron Mitchell as Bruno Carstens 
 Brendon Boone as Jim Handley 
 Michael Kirner  as Mark Handley 
 John Van Dreelen as Lee 
 John Stacy as Gen. Bill Stryker 
 George Wang as Wong 
 Marié du Toit as Lucie Handley 
 Ian Yule as Task Force Leader 
 Bill Brewer as Ship's Captain 
 Romano Puppo as Alberto 
 Larry McEvoy as Dr. Warden 
 Anthony Dawson as Burton 
 Roger Dwyer as Skipper

References

Bibliography
  James McKay. Ray Milland: The Films, 1929-1984. McFarland, 2020.

External links

1973 films
Films directed by Robert Day
Films scored by Francesco De Masi
South African action films
Italian action films
1973 action films
Seafaring films
1970s English-language films
English-language South African films
English-language Italian films
1970s Italian films